The El Gouna International 2021 is the men's edition of the 2021 El Gouna International, which is a PSA World Tour event part of the 2020–21 PSA World Tour. The event will take place in Abu Tig Marina at El Gouna, Egypt from 20 May to 28 May. Mohamed El Shorbagy from Egypt is the champion for this tournament with Paul Coll from New Zealand being the runner-up.

Prize money and ranking points
For the 2021 event, the prize money is $181,500. The prize money and points breakdown is as follows:

Seeds

Draw and results

Finals

Top half

Section 1

Section 2

Bottom half

Section 3

Section 4

See also
 Women's El Gouna International 2021
 El Gouna International

References

External links

Squash tournaments in Egypt
Men's El Gouna International
Men's El Gouna International
El Gouna International